The State Pathologist's Office is a branch of the Department of Justice in the Republic of Ireland. Its function is to provide independent expert advice on matters relating to forensic pathology and to perform post-mortem examinations in those cases where foul play is suspected (so-called 'state cases'). This function includes providing post-mortem reports to the relevant coroner in appropriate instances, as well as attendance at coroners' inquests and at any court proceedings arising out of the Garda investigation into a death. The office also provides advice to coroners on cases which are not the subject of a criminal investigation, but which nevertheless give rise to complex questions of forensic pathology.

There is one full-time Chief State Pathologist, Dr. Linda Mulligan. She is assisted by two Locum Assistant State Pathologists, Dr. Heidi Okkers and Cork-based Dr. Margot Bolster

Since 2015, the State Pathologist's Office and City Mortuary have been based in a former Garda station in Whitehall, Dublin. In 2010 work had begun on building a new premises at a site in nearby Marino but this was subsequently abandoned.

References

External links
 

Department of Justice (Ireland)